Jennifer Ness (born in Cheshire, England in 1972) is an English actress best known for her role as Kris Yates in the ITV drama Bad Girls. She studied at the Mount View Theatre school.

Career
Ness had her first professional role in the TV film The Magician, with Clive Owen, in 1993. She has had roles in Holby City, Casualty, Peak Practice, Hollyoaks, A&E, London's Burning and Reps. She has also performed in a number of theatre productions including End Of Story and Rebecca.

For the role of Kris Yates, Ness had to have her hair cut short from being very long. She said in her Bad Girls interview that she enjoyed the stunt scenes. She also enjoyed the scene when she found Yvonne's body in the hanging cell. The worst scene was when Jim Fenner (Jack Ellis) went mad and urinated on her.

Personal life
Ness was born in Cheshire, England. She lives in Norfolk with her husband and 3 children. She has produced many short films, talking books and is a regular on QVC.

Filmography

References

External links

Interview with Ness on an independent website.

Living people
1972 births
English television actresses
People from Cheshire (before 1974)
Actresses from London